Henri de Schomberg, Comte de Nanteuil  (1575 – 17 November 1632), was a Marshal of France during the reign of Louis XIII.

Biography
Schomberg was born at Paris. Superintendent of Finances from 1619 to 1623. He became Marshal of France in 1625.

In 1628, Schomberg rescued Toiras in the Siege of Saint-Martin-de-Ré with an army of 6,000 men and some cavalry. Together with Toiras he pursued the retreated English army of the Duke of Buckingham, with great loss being sustained by the latter.

Henri de Schomberg commanded Royal troops against the Huguenot rebellions, at the Siege of Privas.

In 1632 he defeated Henri II de Montmorency at the battle of Castelnaudary (1 September 1632). He died soon after, of apoplexy, on 17 November of that year in Bordeaux.

Family
he married in 1598 with Françoise d'Espinay, daughter of Claude d'Espinay. She died on 16 January 1602, and had 2 children : 
Charles de Schomberg (1601-1656), Marshal of France.
Jeanne (1601-1674), married François de Cossé, Duke of Brissac, and later Roger, Duke de la Roche-Guyon.
He remarried with Anne de La Guiche (died in 1663), and had  :
Jeanne-Armande (1632-1706), married Charles II, prince de Guéméné.

See also
 List of Finance Ministers of France

Notes

References

1575 births
1632 deaths
Politicians from Paris
French people of the Thirty Years' War
French generals
Marshals of France
17th-century French nobility
French Ministers of Finance